Holcocoleus is a genus of beetles in the family Carabidae, containing the following species:

 Holcocoleus latus (LaFerte-Senectere, 1851)
 Holcocoleus melanopus Andrewes, 1936

References

Licininae